South Carolina Highway 42 (SC 42) was a state highway that existed in the central part of Orangeburg County. It connected Cordova and Orangeburg.

Route description
SC 32 began at an intersection with SC 33 (now U.S. Route 301 (US 301) and US 601) northeast of Cope. It traveled to the southeast to Cordova. It then proceeded to the northeast and north-northeast to SC 4 (also now US 301/US 601) in Orangeburg.

History
SC 32 was an original state highway, being established at least as early as 1922. It was decommissioned in 1947. It was downgraded to secondary roads. Today, it is known as Legrand Smoak Street, Cordova Road, and Cannon Bridge Road.

Major intersections

See also

References

External links
Former SC 42 at the Virginia Highways South Carolina Annex

042 (1930s–1940s)
Transportation in Orangeburg County, South Carolina